Johann Duveau (born 28 May 1978) is a French retired professional footballer.

Career
Born in Sainte-Gemmes-d'Andigné, Duveau began playing football with the youth side of AS Saint-Étienne. After making only eight Ligue 2 appearances with Saint-Étienne's first team, he was sent with his compatriot Lilian Astier on a short-term loan to play for Burgos CF in Segunda División B.

Duveau had spells with C.S. Marítimo in the Portuguese Liga and Torredonjimeno CF and Gernika Club in Segunda División B, before finishing his career with Valenciennes FC and Saint-Pryvé Saint-Hilaire FC.

References

External links
 Profile on the Saint Etienne site

1978 births
Living people
French footballers
Russian Premier League players
AS Saint-Étienne players
Burgos CF footballers
C.S. Marítimo players
FC Torpedo Moscow players
FC Torpedo-2 players
Valenciennes FC players
Saint-Pryvé Saint-Hilaire FC players
Association football midfielders
Association football forwards